1936–37 was the twenty-ninth occasion on which the Lancashire Cup completion had been held.
Salford won the trophy  by beating  Wigan by 5-2 
The match was played at Wilderspool, Warrington, now in the County Palatine of Chester but (historically in the county of Lancashire. The attendance was 17,500 and receipts were £1,160.
This was the third of the three consecutive Lancashire Cup finals in which Salford would beat Wigan

Background 
The number of teams entering this year’s competition remained the same, with Streatham & Mitcham (hardly a Lancashire club, but useful to make the numbers up) playing in their second (and what was to be their final) season. The total entrants remained at 14 and the same fixture format was retained. 
There was no need for a bye in the first round, but  there was still a "blank" or "dummy" fixture. The bye in the second round remained.

Competition and results

Round 1  
Involved  7 matches (with one "blank" fixture) and 14 clubs

Round 1 - replays  
Involved 1 match

Round 2 – quarterfinals  
Involved 3 matches (with one bye) and 7 clubs

Round 3 – semifinals 
Involved 2 matches and 4 clubs

Semifinals -  First replays  
Involved 1 match

Final

Teams and scorers 

Scoring - Try = three (3) points - Goal = two (2) points - Drop goal = two (2) points

The road to success

Notes and comments 
1 * RUGBYLEAGUEproject show that Broughton Rangers were at home and the match was played at Belle Vue Stadium, but  Widnes  official archives show that Widnes were at home at Naughton Park

2 * The first (and only) Lancashire Cup match played at "home" and at this (Mitcham Stadium) by London club Streatham & Mitcham

3 *  Wilderspool was the home ground of Warrington from 1883 to the end of the 2003 Summer season when they moved into the new purpose built Halliwell Jones Stadium. Wilderspool remained as a sports/Ruugby League ground and is/was used by Woolston Rovers/Warrington Wizards junior club. 
The ground had a final capacity of 9,000 although the record attendance was set in a Challenge cup third round match on 13 March 1948 when 34,304 spectators saw Warrington lose to Wigan 10-13.

See also 
1936–37 Northern Rugby Football League season
Rugby league county cups

References

External links
Saints Heritage Society
1896–97 Northern Rugby Football Union season at wigan.rlfans.com
Hull&Proud Fixtures & Results 1896/1897
Widnes Vikings - One team, one passion Season In Review - 1896-97
The Northern Union at warringtonwolves.org

1936 in English rugby league
RFL Lancashire Cup